Frederick Leslie may refer to:

Frederick W. Leslie (born 1951), NASA scientist
Frederick Hobson Leslie (1855–1892), British actor